Shah Tut (also Romanized as Shāh Tūt) is a village in Bagh-e Keshmir Rural District, Salehabad County, Razavi Khorasan Province, Iran. At the 2006 census, its population was 532, in 112 families.

References 

Populated places in   Torbat-e Jam County